A collaborative network is a network consisting of a variety of entities (e.g. organizations and people) that are largely autonomous, geographically distributed, and heterogeneous in terms of their operating environment, culture, social capital and goals, but that collaborate to better achieve common or compatible goals, and whose interactions are supported by computer networks. The discipline of collaborative networks focuses on the structure, behavior, and evolving dynamics of networks of autonomous entities that collaborate to better achieve common or compatible goals.
There are several manifestations of collaborative networks, e.g.:
 Virtual enterprise (VE)
 Virtual Organization (VO)
 Dynamic Virtual Organization
 Extended Enterprise
 VO Breeding environment (VBE)
 Professional virtual community (PVC)
 Business Ecosystem
 Virtual manufacturing network
 Decentralized Autonomous Organization (DAO)

Applications

Elements 
The seven essential elements of collaborative networks:
 
 Search: Allowing users to search for experts, data or content
 Employee Driven: Approved users can add and share content in wiki fashion with low barriers to authorship
 Data integration: Must allow enterprise data to be integrated into the system
 Dashboards and Monitoring: Measure success, adoption, projects through dashboards and monitoring tools
 User Follow: Ability to follow users and their content in the collaborative network
 Content integration: Connects and links content dynamically
 Governance: Controlled access to content and data

Reference models 
A reference model for collaborative networks is a fundamental instrument for the smooth development of the area. An example of reference model is ARCON (A Reference model for COllaborative Networks).
An annual conference focused on Collaborative Networks is the Working Conference on Virtual Enterprises ('PRO-VE'). sponsored by the International Federation for Information Processing (IFIP) and Society of Collaborative Networks (SOCOLNET).

Challenges
If collaborative networks evolve and become increasingly popular with corporations and their extended networks, governance and security issues will need to be addressed. Of particular relevance is the study of behavioral aspects and reference models for collaborative networks.

See also 

 Innovation - Knowledge engineering - Knowledge management - Semantic web
 Collective intelligence - Polytely
 Global Information Grid
 Open Innovation

Notes

External links
"KarmeUp - Free Collaborative Network" 
"The Future of Collaborative Networks" by Aaron Roe Fulkerson
"How Collaborative Networks will Replace Social Networks" by Mark Fidelman
"Collaborative Enterprise Network" by D. Corkill
"New Collaborative Networks more than Just a Wiki" Read Write Web

Social networks